Servilia ( 101 BC – after 42 BC) was a Roman matron from a distinguished family, the Servilii Caepiones. She was the daughter of Quintus Servilius Caepio and Livia, thus the half-sister of Cato the Younger. She married Marcus Junius Brutus, with whom she had a son, the Brutus who, along with others in the Senate, would assassinate Julius Caesar. After her first husband's death in 77, she married Decimus Junius Silanus, and with him had a son and three daughters.

She gained fame as the mistress of Julius Caesar, whom her son Brutus and son-in-law Gaius Cassius Longinus, would assassinate in 44 BC. Her affair with Caesar seems to have been publicly known in Rome at the time. Plutarch stated that she in turn was madly in love with Caesar. The relationship between the two probably started in 59, after the death of Servilia's second husband although Plutarch implied it began when they were teenagers.

Biography

Early life
Her parents had two other children, a younger Servilia and a Gnaeus Servilius Caepio; her father also likely had another son named Quintus Servilius Caepio from an earlier marriage. They divorced when she was three or four, and her mother then married Marcus Porcius Cato. From this union, Servilia's half-brother, Cato the Younger, and half-sister, Porcia, were born. 

However, her mother and stepfather both died before 91 BC. As a result, Servilia, her younger siblings, and her half-siblings were all brought up in the house of their maternal uncle, Marcus Livius Drusus. He was assassinated during his tribunate in 91 BC, in his own atrium, when Servilia was nine. Her father was ambushed and killed in the immediately ensuing Social War, a war triggered by Drusus' assassination, mere months after her uncle's murder. After this she was probably brought up either by her other maternal uncle Mamercus Aemilius Lepidus Livianus, her maternal grandmother Cornelia or her paternal aunt Servilia. At adulthood, Servilia became legally independent and gained a considerable estate.

Servilia truly had great influence on her half-brother Cato the Younger. He was considered to be tough and wild as a child, which frames Servilia as his equal in those respects.

As a young girl belonging to Roman ruling class, Servilia would have been well educated. She likely would have been taught to read, write, sing, dance, and play an instrument. She would have read poetry, epics, and histories.

Marriages and children

At the age of 13 or 14, she married Marcus Junius Brutus in the early 80s, who later was tribune of the plebs (83 BC) and founder of a colony at Capua. They had one child, the future tyrannicide Marcus Junius Brutus, born around 85 BC. This was a profitable marriage for Brutus, who would gain fortune, stability, and political traction through Servilia. Although the elder Brutus survived Sulla's proscriptions, he was treacherously killed by Pompey after surrendering at Mutina in 77 BC. After the death of the elder Brutus, Servilia's bond with her son grew. She also arranged for her son to be adopted into her family, allowing for the name of the Servilii Caepiones to be preserved.

Servilia subsequently married Decimus Junius Silanus, by whom she had three daughters.  Her daughters were all married into prominent and politically active families, Her first daughter married Publius Servilius Vatia Isauricus; her second married Marcus Aemilius Lepidus (later triumvir); and her third daughter married Gaius Cassius Longinus. Servilia was well connected and facilitated these advantageous marriages herself.

It is speculated that either soon after she married Silanus, or after the births of her daughters, Servilia's notorious affair with Caesar began. Silanus is not depicted to have been against the affair. Servilia did not remarry after the death of Silanus around 59 BC, and remained unmarried for the rest of her life. She was able to live independently as a widow, owning various estates due to inheritances from various wealthy relatives.

Relationship with Caesar

Caesar had numerous affairs with women married and unmarried, but none lasted as long, nor were they as passionate as his affair with Servilia. An intimate relationship between the two probably started in 59, after the death of Servilia's second husband. The affair was well known and Servilia suffered no damage to her reputation because of this relationship. Unlike most other aristocratic affairs, this one seemed also to have lasted over many years.

The relationship broadly is first recorded in extant sources in 63, when Servilia apparently was caught sneaking a love note to Caesar in the senate by her brother Cato. Cato was greatly displeased to find out about Caesar's correspondence with his half-sister. Modern scholars have made use of this incident to indicate the passion between Servilia and Caesar, noting that Servilia maintained long-distance contact while Caesar was away.  as both Cato and Brutus espoused the side of Pompey, despite the latter's role in the death of her former husband.

Plutarch only emphasized Servilia's devotion for Caesar, claiming that she was madly in love with him, but it is widely accepted that Caesar held a deep affection for Servilia. Scholars speculate that it was Caesar's affections which allowed the affair to continue for as long as it did. During his consulship in 59, Caesar supposedly presented Servilia with an outrageously expensive pearl worth some six million sesterces.

Another popular rumor was that Servilia was prostituting her daughter Tertia to Caesar in 47 BC. At an estate auction where Caesar received several properties at a low rate to give to Servilia, Cicero remarked, "It's a better bargain than you think, for there is a third (tertia) off." Some ancient sources refer to the possibility of Caesar being Brutus' real father, despite Caesar being only fifteen years old when Brutus was born. Ancient historians were sceptical of this possibility and "on the whole, scholars have rejected the possibility that Brutus was the love-child of Servilia and Caesar on the grounds of chronology". Perhaps out of a desire to avoid offending Servilia, Caesar gave orders that Brutus should not be harmed if encountered after the Pompeian defeat at Pharsalus.

When her son – Marcus Junius Brutus – divorced his wife Claudia to marry Cato's daughter Porcia in 45, she disapproved, having been instrumental in arranging the match and also disagreeing with the anti-Caesarian stance taken by her half-brother Cato. Servilia may also have been jealous of the affection that Brutus showed his new bride. Later that year, Caesar appointed her son urban praetor for 44.

After Caesar's death 
After Caesar's assassination by a conspiracy which included Servilia's son – Brutus – and son-in-law – Gaius Cassius Longinus – on the Ides of March of 44 BC, . It is unlikely she knew anything of the conspiracy, having been on good terms with Caesar until his death; regardless, she worked to protect her relatives from the ensuing political storm. Apart from Servilia, the only women in attendance were Porcia and Junia Tertia.

Cicero's letters detail other meetings of the senate that Servilia had called to discuss what actions should be taken which would protect her son and sons-in-law. Cicero described her as a 'nervous lady', which could be understood as politically cautious.

Servilia's opinions were often held in higher esteem than those of Cicero during meetings of the liberatores. Due to women being unable to hold office or vote, Servilia focused her political efforts on strategic marriages for her daughters and helping create her political career for her son Brutus.

Due to life-threatening unrest in the city, her son Brutus was able to get a special dispensation to leave the capital for more than 10 days, and he withdrew to one of his estates in Lanuvium, 20 miles south-east of Rome. By mid-May, Antony proposed reassigning Brutus and Cassius from their provinces to instead purchase grain in Asia and Sicily. There was a meeting at Brutus' house attended by Cicero, Brutus and Cassius (and wives), and Brutus' mother, in which Cassius announced his intention to go to Syria while Brutus wanted to return to Rome, but ended up going to Greece. His initial plan to go to Rome, however, was to put on games in early July commemorating his ancestor Lucius Junius Brutus and promoting his cause; he instead delegated the games to a friend. Servilia assisted in organising Brutus' games, in charge of decisions concerning the ceremony, finances, and senatorial contacts. Antony's proposed reassignment also was dropped by the senate; Cicero claims that it was because of some action by Servilia.

Servilia led a council meeting in July 43 to discuss the possible return of Brutus and Cassius from exile, which serves as the most explicit depiction of a woman overseeing a meeting in this period.

Later life 
Despite her connections with the conspirators, Servilia escaped the purges of the second triumvirate unscathed due to the protection of her long-time friend Titus Pomponius Atticus. After Brutus' death, her son's ashes were sent to her by Antony from Philippi.

Very little is known about Servilia's life after the death of Brutus. She is suspected to have died a natural death between 27 and 23 BC. Her youngest daughter, Junia Tertia, out-lived Augustus and was noticed by Tacitus to have had a splendid funeral which kept the memory of Brutus and Cassius alive.

Marriages and issue
Marcus Junius Brutus
Marcus Junius Brutus
Decimus Junius Silanus, the consul of 62 BC

Junia Prima (married Publius Servilius Isauricus)
Junia Secunda (married Marcus Aemilius Lepidus, future triumvir)
Junia Tertia (married Gaius Cassius Longinus, another prominent assassin of Julius Caesar)

Cultural depictions

Literature
Servilia is the subject of a poem by John Dryden.  A fictionalized Servilia appears in the Emperor series of novels by Conn Iggulden, who has portrayed her as a courtesan. Servilia is a character in Colleen McCullough's Masters of Rome series.

Television and film
A fictionalised version of Servilia was among the principal characters in the 2005 HBO television series Rome, played by Lindsay Duncan. The Servilia of HBO's Rome was depicted as instigating actor in the plot against Caesar's life; there is no historical evidence thereof. A similarly fictionalised Servilia makes an appearance in the 2005 six-part mini series Empire, played by Trudie Styler. Natalie Medlock portrays Servilia in the 2018 Netflix television docudrama series Roman Empire.

See also
 Servilia gens
 List of Roman women

References

Citations

Sources
Modern sources

 
 
 

Ancient sources

 Suetonius, Julius Caesar 50
 
 
 Appian, Civil Wars
 Cicero, Letters F 12.7, A 14.21, A 15.11, A 15.12
 Cornelius Nepos, Atticus

External links

The interesting family connections of Servilia
A letter from Cicero about a conversation with Servilia (English translation)

 
2nd-century BC births
1st-century BC deaths
2nd-century BC Roman women
1st-century BC Roman women
1st-century BC Romans
Family of Marcus Junius Brutus
Mistresses of Julius Caesar
Servilii Caepiones
Year of birth uncertain
Year of death uncertain